The Romanian Gymnastics National Championships is the annual artistic gymnastics national competition held in Romania.

Women's all-around champions

References

Romania
Gymnastics competitions in Romania
1970 establishments in Romania
Recurring sporting events established in 1970
Gymnastics